The 2019 ITF Men's World Tennis Tour is the 2019 edition of the second tier tour for men's professional tennis. It is organised by the International Tennis Federation and is a tier below the ATP Tour. The ITF Men's World Tennis Tour includes tournaments with prize money ranging from $15,000 to $25,000.

Key

Month

April

May

June

External links
 International Tennis Federation official website

 2